"The Golden Goose" is a fairy tale collected by the Brothers Grimm (KHM 64).

Story 
In the Brothers Grimm version, the hero is the youngest of three brothers, given the nickname Simpleton as he is not handsome or strong like his brothers. His eldest brother is sent into the forest to chop wood, fortified with a rich cake and a bottle of wine. He meets a little gray man who begs a morsel to eat and a swallow of wine but is rebuffed. The eldest brother later injures his arm falling into a tree and is taken home. The second brother meets a similar fate when he injures his foot. Simpleton, sent out with a burned biscuit cooked in the ashes of the hearth and soured beer, is generous with the little old man, who turns the biscuit and beer into a proper cake and fine wine. For his act of generosity, Simpleton is rewarded with a golden goose he discovers within the roots of a tree he cut down chosen by the little gray man.

Simpleton takes The Golden Goose to market. With the goose under his arm, he heads for an inn where as soon as his back is turned, the innkeeper's daughter attempts to pluck just one of the feathers of pure gold and is stuck fast. Her sister comes to help her and is stuck fast too. The youngest daughter is determined not to be left out of the riches, grabs the sisters aprons and she ends up stuck to the second. Simpleton makes his way to the castle and each person who attempts to interfere is joined to the unwilling parade ranging from the innkeeper, parson, his sexton, two laborers, some village children, village girls, etc.

In the castle lives the King with the Princess who has never smiled or laughed. The king offers the hand of the princess to anyone who succeeds in making her laugh. The despondent Princess, sitting by the window and glimpsing the parade staggering after Simpleton and his golden goose, bursts out laughing. Some versions include an additional three trials: finding someone who can eat a mountain of bread; find someone who can drink all the wine in the kingdom; and find a ship that can sail on both land and sea. Simpleton succeeds in all with the help of his little old friend and finally wins the princess's hand in marriage.

Variations 
Folklorist D. L. Ashliman has pointed out other versions of a Golden Fowl theme: The Goose That Laid the Golden Eggs (Aesop); The Golden Mallard (from the Jataka stories of the Buddha's former births); the Huma bird (Persia).

Modern interpretations 
A musical version of The Golden Goose, written by Dieter Stegmann and Alexander S. Bermange was presented at the Amphitheater Park Schloss Philippsruhe, Hanau, Germany as part of the Brothers Grimm Festival in 2006.

It was also featured as an episode of the PC game American McGee's Grimm where the goose is 10 times its size and its victims have their bodies completely stuck to the goose rather than falling in a conga line as in the story.

The Jataka 
The Buddha (Bodhisatta) was born, grew up, and got married. During his life, he was a member of the Hindu caste group of hereditary priests and scholars. He also had three daughters named Nanda, Nandavati, and Sundarinanda. When he died, he was reincarnated as a golden goose with golden feathers, and after discovering his wife and daughters were being taken care of by others, he decided to give them some of his feathers; he hoped the feathers would help them live comfortably.

Over time, he brought them more feathers to sell, and they were living in a continuous state of comfort and peace; until one day, when his wife became greedy and decided to formulate a plan to steal all of his feathers for money. His daughters did not like the idea of stealing his feathers, so they did not agree to the idea. Alas, the next time the golden goose came back, his wife plucked all of his feathers. When she did this, the feathers immediately changed from golden feathers to white crane feathers. The wife waited for the golden feathers to grow back, but they never did; they grew back white, and the goose flew away, never to return again.

Classification 
"The Golden Goose" falls in Aarne-Thompson type 571 (All Stick Together); the appended episode is of A-T Type 513B (The Land-and-Water Ship).

Literary examination 
The hero is the youngest of three brothers, given the nickname "Dummling" (Simpleton). His eldest brother is sent into the forest to chop wood (the Task), fortified with a rich cake and a bottle of wine. He meets a little gray man (the Disguised Helper) who begs a morsel to eat and a drop to drink but is rebuffed. The eldest brother meets an accident and is taken home. The second brother meets a similar fate. Dummling, sent out with a biscuit cooked in the ashes of the hearth and soured beer, is generous with the little old man and is rewarded with a golden goose (the Fairy Gift).

The goose has been discovered within the roots of the tree chosen by the little gray man and felled by Dummling. Tellers of this tale could not have been aware of the imprisonment of Osiris. For archaic Greek spirits within oak trees, see dryads.

With the goose under his arm, Dummling heads for an inn, where, as soon as his back is turned, the innkeeper's daughter attempts to pluck just one of the feathers of pure gold, and is stuck fast (Greed A-T Type 68A; Justice is Served). Her sister, coming to help her, is stuck fast too. And the youngest (Least of Three), determined not to be left out of the riches, is stuck to the second. Dummling makes his way to the castle, and each person who attempts to interfere is joined to the unwilling parade: the parson, his sexton, and two laborers.

In the castle lives the King with the Princess (the Princess Prize) who has never laughed. But the despondent Princess, sitting by the window and glimpsing the parade staggering after Dummling and his golden goose, laughs so hard. Dummling, after three more impossible trials including finding a ship that sails on land and sea, sometimes inserted in the tale, in each of which he is assisted by the little gray man, wins the Princess and everyone lives happily ever after.

See also

 The Princess Who Never Smiled
 The Magic Swan
 Peruonto

References
Babbitt, E.C. (Ed.). (1922). More Jataka Tales. New York, NY: D. Appleton-Century Company.

External links

 
 "The Grimm Brothers' Children's and Household Tales (Grimms' Fairy Tales)": D. L. Ashliman gives Aarne-Thompson types

Grimms' Fairy Tales
Fictional geese
Animal tales
Laughter
ATU 560-649
ATU 500-559